is a dish of the Ainu people of northern Japan, consisting of seafood that is frozen outdoors, sliced like sashimi, and served with soy sauce and water peppers.

References

Ainu cuisine
Salmon dishes